Lebanon had four competitors at the 1992 Winter Olympics in Albertville, France, all of whom took part in the men's slalom skiing events.

In the Super G, Elias Majdalani finished 58th. In the Giant Slalom, Majdalani finished 57th and Dany Abounaoum 88th, while Raymond Kayrouz and Jean Khalil both missed gates and were disqualified. In the Slalom, Khalil finished 53rd and Abounaoum 62nd, while Majdalani failed to start and Kayrouz failed to finish his first run.

Competitors
The following is the list of number of competitors in the Games.

Alpine skiing

Men

References

Official Olympic Report, accessed 2007-11-02.
 Olympic Winter Games 1992, full results by sports-reference.com

Nations at the 1992 Winter Olympics
1992 Winter Olympics
1992 in Lebanese sport